Joe Adams (April 11, 1924 – July 3, 2018) was an American actor, disc jockey, businessman and manager. He was manager to Ray Charles and won a Golden Globe — the first African-American to do so.

Early years 
Adams was a native of Los Angeles. His father was a Jewish businessman, and his mother was African-American.

Career 
After being told that, because of his race, he should not try for a career in radio, Adams took an indirect route to reach that goal. He went from being a truck driver to being chauffeur and general assistant for Los Angeles radio personality Al Jarvis. After six months, Adams had become Jarvis' assistant producer.

Adams was the first African-American announcer on NBC's radio network, handling West Coast jazz remote broadcasts and producing segments of NBC's Monitor program. In 1948, he became a disc jockey and announcer on KOWL radio in Santa Monica, California, and 10 years later he was described in a newspaper article as "the station's top personality and most valuable property".

Adams became the Emcee and stage director for the fourth Cavalcade of Jazz concert held at Wrigley Field in Los Angeles which was produced by Leon Hefflin Sr. on September 12, 1948, and continued for the annual event for 10 more years. The event showcased over 125 artists over time.  Dizzy Gillespie, Frankie Lane, Little Miss Cornshucks, The Sweethearts of Rhythm, The Honey Drippers, Joe Turner, Jimmy Witherspoon, The Blenders and The Sensations were all featured as Adams emceed his first Cavalcade of Jazz concert.

On June 19, 1951, Adams began his own television program on KTTV in Los Angeles. The show featured Adams' 15-piece orchestra, vocalist Mauri Lynn, and the Hi Hatters dance team.

In 1954 Adams played boxer "Husky Miller" in the award-winning "Carmen Jones" film opera featuring an all-black cast headed by Best Actress Oscar-nominee Dorothy Dandridge.

On stage, Adams had the role of Joe Nashua in the Broadway musical Jamaica (1957).

Personal life 
Adams married Emma Millhouse in 1946. They remained married until his death 72 years later.

Recognition
The Los Angeles City Council designated March 15, 1953, a day to honor Adams. In 1955, he received FEM magazine's Man of the Year Award.

Papers
Adams' photographs, scrapbooks, and other materials are housed in the Joe Adams Papers collection in the Archives Center, National Museum of American History of the Smithsonian Institution.

Filmography

Film

Television

References

External links

1924 births
2018 deaths
20th-century American male actors
American male film actors
African-American male actors
African-American businesspeople
African-American DJs
American bandleaders
Male actors from Los Angeles
Jewish American male actors
New Star of the Year (Actor) Golden Globe winners
African-American Jews
21st-century African-American people
21st-century American Jews